Lee Siegfried (born Lee Anthony Mroszak on December 11, 1968, in Minnesota), known by the on-air moniker Crazy Cabbie, is an American DJ. He broadcast on New York City's 92.3 K-Rock and is a former regular guest on The Howard Stern Show.

Mroszak previously worked for two radio stations in the Twin Cities, spending time as part of the 92 KQRS Morning Show. Mroszak was fired from KQRS after he faked a segment implying that Brett Favre was staying in a Minneapolis hotel with a woman other than his wife.

Mroszak began his radio career as a frequent caller known as "Cabbie" on The Andy Savage Show, airing on Minneapolis' 93.7 The Edge. When Howard Stern's show came to town, Mroszak moved to the KQRS Morning Show, the highest-rated morning drive show in Minneapolis.

KQRS hijinks
Mroszak raised his visibility at KQRS as a street reporter who took some listeners on a tour of the city's crack cocaine market. In one attempt to be outrageous, Mroszak did a "remote report" in which he claimed to have knocked on NFL star Brett Favre's hotel room door when the NFL's Green Bay Packers were in town for a Monday night game. Mroszak claimed that he intended to offer Favre some Vicodin and a six-pack of beer, but that he instead discovered the quarterback with a naked female who was not his wife. The report ended abruptly, but the press contacted the station for further information. Mroszak was forced into hiding, but eventually admitted that the story was completely fabricated. With his credibility shattered, Mroszak was fired by KQRS and the station apologized to Favre.

The Howard Stern Show
On The Howard Stern Show, Mroszak would often discuss his service in the 82nd Airborne Division. He would talk about deployment during Gulf War, events that occurred during his stint as a DJ for K-Rock radio in NYC, and many incidents in his personal life.

On the March 23, 2001 show, The Howard Stern Show paid Mroszak $3,000 to confirm the details of his honorable discharge from the Army. Mroszak revealed that he and several other men had sex with the daughter of a Delta Force Sergeant Major. The interview shifted to Stern interrogating Mroszak about his involvement in a sexual situation that involved the presence of several men. Mroszak confirmed that he has engaged in homosexual sex in his youth but contends that he is not attracted to men.

Mroszak fought two boxing matches during his association with The Howard Stern Show. On April 27, 2001, he fought Wack Pack member Angry Black to a five-round draw and on May 31, 2002, he was defeated by Stuttering John by unanimous decision.

On July 27, 2006, Mroszak was released from prison after serving a one-year sentence for tax evasion, and immediately went to Sirius Satellite Radio to visit Howard Stern. On August 15, 2006, Mroszak substituted for Sirius radio host Scott Ferrall, who was on vacation.

In 2001, Mroszak filmed a porno movie featuring Ron Jeremy. The existence of the footage was questioned until Jeremy documented the production in his autobiography, Ron Jeremy: The Hardest (Working) Man in Showbiz. When Jeremy went on the show in 2007 to promote the book, Mroszak was confronted by Stern and crew about the issue. Mroszak contended that he directed the film but did not directly participate, but rather played "a Steven Spielberg type role" and that the film had been destroyed. On February 8, 2007, Stern questioned whether Mroszak could ever again be trusted, while Fred Norris described the porn antics as "a sign of disrespect." In 2009, Jeremy confirmed that Mroszak acted in the movie.

On June 28, 2007, Mroszak was fired by Sirius Satellite Radio after claiming on his website and on the Opie and Anthony radio show  that he was in possession of a Howard Stern sex tape.

In a 2015 podcast interview, Siegfried mentioned that he had retired from radio after being fired from Sirius.

Tax trouble
Mroszak spent one year in federal prison for tax evasion. He was arrested after saying on the November 9, 2004 Howard Stern Show that he did not file a tax return in many years and would not resume filing until the U.S. government cured his Gulf War Syndrome. An IRS employee happened to be listening and reported him. Mroszak pleaded guilty to tax evasion in federal court in December 2004, and was sentenced to one year in prison and ordered to pay his outstanding taxes.

On July 29, 2005, Mroszak was imprisoned at the Federal Correctional Institution in Fort Dix, New Jersey. On February 27, 2006, it was reported on The Howard Stern Show that he was "recently" moved to Federal Medical Center (FMC) Devens in Ayer, Massachusetts.

Mroszak was released from prison on July 27, 2006, and appeared on The Howard Stern Show that same day to discuss his prison experiences.

Health problems
In 2020, it was reported Mroszak suffers from GBS-CIPD, a rare nerve disorder that can result in paralysis. 

In 2021 during an interview with Brad Straubinger for the Here's the Pitch podcast, Mroszak disclosed that he is now confined to a wheelchair and can no longer walk, but hopes to launch his own podcast.

References

1968 births
Living people
Television personalities from New York City
United States Army personnel of the Gulf War
American people convicted of tax crimes
American adoptees
Prisoners and detainees of the United States federal government
Radio personalities from New York City
United States Army soldiers